Spyridium × ramosissimum, commonly known as branched spyridium, is a species of flowering plant in the family Rhamnaceae and is endemic to Victoria in Australia. It is a small shrub with woolly-hairy branches, egg-shaped leaves, and crowded heads of hairy flowers with brown bracts.

Description
The edges of the leaves curve slightly downwards, the upper surface greyish-green and the lower surface silky- or rusty-hairy with a prominent midvein. The heads of flowers are crowded with egg-shaped, brown bracts at the base, each head with only a few flowers.

Taxonomy
This species was first formally described in 1922 by James Wales Claredon Audas who gave it the name Trymalium × ramosissimum in The Victorian Naturalist from specimens collected on Mount Difficult in the Grampians. In 2006, Jürgen Kellermann changed the name to Spyridium × ramosissimum in the journal Muelleria.

Distribution
Spyridium × ramosissimum is a hybrid between S. daltonii and S. parvifolium and is only known from the Grampians, where both parent species occur. It is not known to produce seed.

References

ramosissimum
Rosales of Australia
Flora of Victoria (Australia)
Plants described in 1922
Plant nothospecies